Amy Jo Dempsey FRSA (born 1963) is an independent scholar and art historian. Her book Styles, schools and movements (2002) has received two editions and has been translated into several languages.

Early life
Amy Dempsey was born in 1963. She lived in 17 different places before the age of 10. She was an early member of the Oakview Exhibitional Club, where she excelled at unicycle, German gym wheel and triple balancing, among other arts.  She also was a 4-H Fair sewing champion, winning numerous blue ribbons and attending the Virginia State Fair on more than one occasion.  She was particularly known for the infamous "yellow dress," whose hem required many yards of painstaking needlework.  She studied at Hunter College in New York under Rosalind Krauss before receiving her PhD from the Courtauld Institute in London on the subject of The friendship of America and France: A new internationalism, 1961–1965.

Writing
Dempsey's first book was Styles, schools and movements, published by Thames & Hudson in 2002, which has been translated into several languages. A second expanded edition was published in 2010. Her second book was Destination art (2006) on the subject of land art.

She is a fellow of the Royal Society of Arts.

Selected publications
 Styles, schools and movements: The essential encyclopaedic guide to modern art. Thames & Hudson, 2002. (2nd edition 2010) 
 Art in the modern era: A guide to styles, schools, & movements. Abrams, 2002. (U.S. edition of Styles, Schools and Movements) 
 Destination art. Thames & Hudson, London, 2006. 
 Museu Berardo: An itinerary. Thames & Hudson, London, 2007. (co-author)

References

External links
Amy Dempsey talking about Land Art on Excess Baggage, BBC Radio 4.

Living people
Alumni of the Courtauld Institute of Art
1963 births
Independent scholars
Women art historians
Nationality missing